The Revenue Act of 1918, 40 Stat. 1057, raised income tax rates over those established the previous year. The bottom tax bracket was expanded but raised from 2% to 6%.

The act simplified the tax structure created by the 1917 act.  Instead of applying a "like normal tax" and a "like additional tax" to the 1916 act normal tax and additional tax it created a single tax structure with a Normal Tax and a Surtax.

The top rate was increased to 77%, and applied to income above $1,000,000. The top rate of the War Revenue Act of 1917 had taxed all income above $2,000,000 at a 67% rate.

The act was applicable to incomes for 1918.  For 1919 and 1920 the top normal tax rate was reduced from 12 percent to 8%.  This reduced the top marginal tax rate that combined normal tax and surtax from 77% to 73%.

Even in 1918, only 5% of the population paid federal income taxes (up from 1% in 1913), and yet the income tax funded one-third of the cost of World War I.

Income Tax for Individuals 

A Normal Tax and a Surtax were levied against the net income of individuals as shown in the following table.  

Exemption of $1,000 for single filers and $2,000 for married couples and head of family; $200 exemption for each dependent under 18.

Inflation-adjusted numbers
Corrected for inflation by CPI:

Notes 

65th United States Congress
1918 in law
United States federal taxation legislation